Binalud may refer to:
Mount Binalud, in Iran
Binalud Mountains, in Iran
Binalud County, an administrative subdivision of Iran
Binalud Rural District, an administrative subdivision of Iran